North Lynn is an urban residential area of King's Lynn, in the unparished area of Kings Lynn, in the King's Lynn and West Norfolk district, in the county of Norfolk, England.

There are three main parks in North Lynn: Peck's field (named after the previous owner of the land before the North Lynn estate was created), The Rec (RECreation Ground) and Colombia Park. North Lynn has one junior school, one primary school and one infant school, respectively: St Edmund's Junior School, St Edmund's (Foundation Community) Primary School, and Highgate Infant School.  Some children go to Eastgate Primary instead of St Edmond's (Foundation Community).

North Lynn also has two large ponds popular with anglers. These are collectively known as the "long ponds", and were created as reserves of fresh water in case of emergency.

Civil parish 
In 1931 the parish had a population of 91. On 1 April 1935 the parish was abolished to form Kings Lynn.

References

External links
 A website with a vast catalogue of Norfolk towns
 https://www.facebook.com/NorthLynnPartnership

Former civil parishes in Norfolk
King's Lynn